¡Soy Libre! ¡Soy Bueno! is an album by Argentine singer and guitarist Atahualpa Yupanqui. It was released in 1968 on the Le Chant du Monde label.

Track listing
Side A
 "Trabajo, Quiero Trabajo" (translated, "Work, I Want Work") (Atahualpa Yupanqui) [2:55]
 "Lloran Las Ramas del Viento" (translated, "the branches of the wind cry") (Atahualpa Yupanqui) [2:35]
 "Le Tengo Rabia al Silencio" (translated, "I am angry at the silence") (Atahualpa Yupanqui) [3:44]
 "La Copla" (Atahualpa Yupanqui, Pablo del Cerro) [3:44]
 "Triste Número 5" (Julián Aguirre) [3:03]

Side B
 "Soy Libre" (translated, "I am free") (traditional) [3:52]
 "Danza de la Paloma Enamorada" (translated, "Dance of the dove in love") (Atahualpa Yupanqui) [2:25]
 "El Poeta" (Atahualpa Yupanqui) [2:15]
 "El Pintor" (Atahualpa Yupanqui) [2:03]
 "La Olvidada" (translated, "The forgotten") (Atahualpa Yupanqui, Hermanos Díaz) [2:20]
 "Danza Del Maíz Maduro" (translated, "Dance of ripe corn") (Atahualpa Yupanqui) [4:20]

References

1968 albums
Atahualpa Yupanqui albums